Security Forces Headquarters – Wanni is a regional command of the Sri Lanka Army, that is responsible for the operational deployment and command all army units stationed in and around the southern part or the Vanni region  of the Northern Province, this includes several divisions and the independent brigades. Currently due to ongoing combat operations it is the largest command in the country. It is one of the five Security Forces Headquarters and the General Officer Commanding it is one of the most senior officers in the army, the post is designated as Commander Security Forces Headquarters  - Vanni. The current Commander SFHQ-W is Major General Hemantha Bandara. The SFHQ-W is based at the defense complex at Vavuniya.

Although it is primary a command of the Sri Lanka Army it coordinates operations and deployments of ground units of the Navy, Air Force and police with that of the army in that area. The Sri Lanka Navy units in the Northern Province come under the North Central Naval Area Command and Sri Lanka Air Force units come under its own Northern Zonal Command.

Composition
56 Division, operating in the Vavuniya District
61 Division, operating in the Vavuniya District
21 Division 
54 Division
62 Division
Area Headquarters Mannar

Previous Commander Security Forces Headquarters  - Wanni
Brigadier (Later Major General)T Paranagama
Major General (later General) Shantha Kottegoda, 
Major General (later General) Lionel Balagalle
Major General Sisira Wijesooriya
Major General (field Marshal) Sarath Fonseka
Major General (later Lieutenant General) Parami Kulatunga
Major General Upali Edirisinghe
Major General Neil Dias
Major General Wasantha Perera
Major General (later Lieutenant General) Jagath Jayasuriya
Major General Kumudu Perera RWP RSP VSV USP ndu
Major General HJS Gunawardena RSP VSV USP ndc psc	
Major General AMR Dharmasiri ndu psc	
Major General JMUD Jayasinghe	
Major General WLPW Perera RWP RSP ndu

References

Commands of the Sri Lanka Army
Government of Vavuniya District